The 1974 South Dakota gubernatorial election was held on November 5, 1974, to elect a Governor of South Dakota. This election was the first in South Dakota to elect the governor for a four-year term, after it was allowed by a constitutional amendment passed in 1972. Democratic nominee and Governor Richard F. Kneip was re-elected, defeating Republican nominee John E. Olson. , this is the last time that a Democrat was elected Governor of South Dakota, marking the start of the longest Republican winning streak in the country for a state's governorship.

Democratic primary

Candidates
Richard F. Kneip, incumbent Governor of South Dakota
 Bill Dougherty, Lieutenant Governor of South Dakota

Results

Republican primary

Candidates
 John E. Olson
 Ronald F. Williamson
 Oscar W. Hagen

Results

General election

Results

References

1974
South Dakota
Gubernatorial
November 1974 events in the United States